Kribi Power Station is a 216 MW natural gas-fired thermal power plant in Cameroon.

Location

Description
Kribi Power Station is owned and operated by Kribi Power Development Corporation (KPDC), an affiliate of AES Group, an American power generating company that also owns Cameroon's power distribution company, AES-SONEL. The power station is designed and built to generate capacity output of 216MW by burning natural gas provided by National Hydrocarbons Corporation (SNH). The plant is also designed to use diesel, if the natural gas is unavailable.

Moreover, a step-down transformer (36MVA, Siemens) enables feeding Kribi under 30 kV. At completion date, the 216MW of electricity supplied by the plant increased Cameroon's generated capacity to 1,233 MW. Hydroelectric plants supply 720MW (58.4%) and thermal power plants supply the remaining 513 (41.6%).

Construction costs
Construction of the power station is budgeted to cost about US$390 million (CFA:176.3 billion).  Of that US$132.5 million (CFA:60 billion) is provided as a loan, by a consortium of banks led by Ecobank. The African Development Bank (AfDB) will lend another US$64.3 million (EUR:45 million). The remaining US$193.2 million (CFA:87.5 billion) will be sourced from other lenders.

Timeframe
Construction began in March 2009. Commissioning was completed in June 2013.

See also

Kribi
List of power stations in Cameroon
List of power stations in Africa

References

External links
 Location of Kribi Power Station At Google Maps

Natural gas-fired power stations in Cameroon